Daryle may refer to:

Daryle H. Busch (1928–2021), American inorganic chemist
Daryle Lamont Jenkins (born 1968), American political activist
Daryle Lamonica (1941–2022), American football quarterback
Daryle Singletary (1971–2018), American country music singer
Daryle Skaugstad, former nose tackle in the National Football League
Daryle Smith (1964–2010), American football offensive tackle
Daryle Ward (born 1975), American former professional baseball